National Route 8 (N8) is a  north-south major primary national route that forms part of the Philippine Highway Network in the province of Cebu. There are two highways that make up the road: the Cebu North Road and Natalio Bacalso Avenue (also known as the Cebu South Road). It runs from Danao to Santander. The highway also forms part of the Philippine Nautical Highway System, particularly the Central Nautical Highway from Danao to Cebu City and Western Nautical Highway from Cebu City to Santander.

History 
The highways of N8 were possibly constructed during the American period. An example of this is Osmeña Boulevard and General Maxilom Avenue, one of the major roads of the city. It was made part of the greater Cebu South Road and Cebu North Road respectively. Around 2014-2017, national routes were added, two roads (Cebu North Road; Cebu City to Danao and Natalio Bacalso Avenue; Cebu City to Santander) assigned as National Route 8 (N8) by the Department of Public Works and Highways.

Route description

Danao to Cebu 

N8 begins at Cebu North Road at the route transitioning from N810 in Danao. It then passes the future terminus of the Metro Cebu Expressway. The route then traverses the towns of Compostela and Liloan, where it veers away from the eastern coast of Cebu towards Consolacion and Mandaue. In Mandaue, it is locally known as M.C. Briones Street and Lopez-Jaena Street. It then enters Cebu City, locally known as M.J. Cuenco Avenue.

Cebu City 

In Cebu City, the route turns northwest at a junction from M.J. Cuenco Avenue to General Maxilom Avenue. At the latter's western terminus at the Fuente Osmeña circle, the route then turns north and south, thus covering Osmeña Boulevard's section from the Cebu Provincial Capitol to Natalio Bacalso Avenue, where the route turns west at a junction with the latter and continues towards southern Cebu.

Cebu to Santander 

The route continues as Natalio Bacalso Avenue, traversing Talisay, Minglanilla, Naga, San Fernando, Carcar (where the road continues around the Carcar City Circle), Sibonga, Argao, Dalaguete, Alcoy, Boljoon, Oslob, and Santander. In Santander, it terminates at its transition to N830.

Intersections

See also 
 Philippine highway network
 Cebu South Road
 Natalio Bacalso Avenue
 Osmeña Boulevard

References

External links 
 Department of Public Works and Highways

Roads in Cebu

tl:Lansangan N8 (Pilipinas)